Rhodt unter Rietburg is a municipality in Südliche Weinstraße district, in Rhineland-Palatinate, western Germany. Rietburg castle (ruins) is located on a nearby hill. The village has been making wine for over 1200 years, and is one of the centres of Palatine wine as a home of Rietburg wine co-operative.

References

Municipalities in Rhineland-Palatinate
Palatinate Forest